Yell County is a county in the U.S. state of Arkansas. As of the 2020 census, the population was 20,263. The county has two county seats, Dardanelle and Danville.  Yell County is Arkansas's 42nd county, formed on December 5, 1840, from portions of Scott and Pope counties. It was named after Archibald Yell, who was the state's first member of the United States House of Representatives and the second governor of Arkansas. He died in combat at the Battle of Buena Vista during the Mexican–American War.

This is an alcohol prohibition or dry county. Yell County is part of the Russellville, AR Micropolitan Statistical Area.

History

Native Americans first inhabited present-day Yell County and the Arkansas River Valley for thousands of years prior to European colonization. They used the open, fertile floodplain of the Arkansas River for hunting grounds and later farming settlements. During the Thomas Jefferson and Indian Removal era, many Cherokee were voluntarily relocating from Georgia along the Arkansas River, including in Yell County, between 1775 and 1786. A large Cherokee reservation across the Arkansas River from Yell County was established in 1815 to encourage further voluntary relocation from Georgia.

The area presently encompassed as Yell County was first settled by European settlers when James Carden built a house in 1819 among Cherokee farms in the Dardanelle Bottoms, at the confluence of the Arkansas and Petit Jean rivers. Lands south of the Arkansas River had been deeded to the Choctaw in the 1820s when they removed from their homelands east of the Mississippi River, but white settlement and Cherokee relocation continued apace into the 1820s. The peoples competed over the prime river-bottom lands.

In June 1823, a meeting between numerous Cherokee chiefs and acting Territorial Governor Robert Crittenden was held under two large oak trees.

Some Cherokee remained on their farms south of the river, the group identifying itself as Black Dutch, intermarrying and assimilating with the area's white settlers.

In 1830, the United States Congress enacted the Indian Removal Act, leading to further, forcible Cherokee settlement from the Southeast into the Arkansas River Valley. Cherokee, Muskogee (Creek), and Seminole were forcibly removed along the Trail of Tears through Yell County to Indian Territory (present-day Oklahoma).

Geography

Adjacent counties
 Pope County (north)
 Conway County (northeast)
 Perry County (east)
 Garland County (southeast)
 Montgomery County (south)
 Scott County (west)
 Logan County (northwest)

National protected areas
 Holla Bend National Wildlife Refuge (part)
 Ouachita National Forest (part)
 Ozark National Forest (part)

Demographics

2020 census

As of the 2020 United States census, there were 20,263 people, 7,503 households, and 5,542 families residing in the county.

2000 census
As of the 2000 census, there were 21,139 people, 7,922 households, and 5,814 families residing in the county. The racial makeup of the county was 86.63% White, 1.47% Black or African American, 0.58% Native American, 0.69% Asian, 0.03% Pacific Islander, 8.99% from other races, and 1.62% from two or more races. 12.73% of the population were Hispanic or Latino of any race. 12.00% reported speaking Spanish at home.

There were 7,922 households, out of which 33.60% had children under the age of 18 living with them, 58.50% were married couples living together, 10.10% had a female householder with no husband present, and 26.60% were non-families. 23.20% of all households were made up of individuals, and 11.80% had someone living alone who was 65 years of age or older. The average household size was 2.61 and the average family size was 3.04.

In the county, the population was spread out, with 25.80% under the age of 18, 8.90% from 18 to 24, 28.30% from 25 to 44, 22.00% from 45 to 64, and 15.00% who were 65 years of age or older. The median age was 36 years. For every 100 females, there were 99.50 males. For every 100 females age 18 and over, there were 96.30 males.

The median income for a household in the county was $28,916, and the median income for a family was $33,409. Males had a median income of $23,172 versus $18,148 for females. The per capita income for the county was $15,383. About 11.70% of families and 15.40% of the population were below the poverty line, including 20.20% of those under age 18 and 12.80% of those age 65 or over.

Human resources

Public safety

The Yell County Sheriff's Office is the primary law enforcement agency in the county. The agency is led by the Yell County Sheriff, an official elected by countywide vote every four years. Police departments in Dardanelle, Danville, and Ola provide law enforcement in their respective jurisdictions, with Bellville, Havana, and Plainview contracting with the Sheriff's Office for law enforcement services.

The current sheriff of Yell County is Nick Gault. Gault was elected to office in the 2022 General Election.

The chief officer of the law in Yell County, as in all Arkansas counties, is the sheriff.

Culture and contemporary life

Yell County has several historical homes, structures, and monuments dedicated to preserving the history and culture of the area. The Dardanelle Commercial Historic District preserves the historic commercial hub of Yell County along the Arkansas River. The Mt. Nebo State Park Cabins Historic District preserves ten cabins built by the Civilian Conservation Corps in the 1930s. The county also has seven homes, three churches, and two bridges listed on the NRHP.

Upon settlement, Yell County's varied topography created a stratified society, splitting settlers between the more fertile and productive farms of the "lowlands" and the subsistence farming of the steep and less-productive mountain soil of the "uplands". A planter class emerged in the lowlands, and as Dardanelle evolved into a cohesive community, the large landowners moved to town and managed their landholdings from stately homes, similar to the model seen in the Arkansas Delta and the Mississippi Delta. This left the lowlands inhabited largely by poor sharecroppers and tenant farmers, who largely shared economic fortunes with the small farms in the uplands, shifting the "upland/lowland" split to a "town-country" divide based largely on economics.

As mechanization and society evolved and Arkansas became less of a frontier, a wealthy upper class emerged in Dardanelle that came to wield societal, political, and economic power in the county. This society remained relatively closed, with separate social events and often summering on Mount Nebo with other wealthy Arkansans visiting to enjoy the cool mountain breezes. With little of the industrialization that defined the Gilded Age in the Northeast and Midwest, Yell County instead retained an adjusted Old South economic model based on agriculture but adapted to a post-Reconstruction reality.

Government

The county government is a constitutional body granted specific powers by the Constitution of Arkansas and the Arkansas Code. The quorum court is the legislative branch of the county government and controls all spending and revenue collection. Representatives are called justices of the peace and are elected from county districts every even-numbered year. The number of districts in a county vary from nine to fifteen, and district boundaries are drawn by the county election commission. The Yell County Quorum Court has eleven members. Presiding over quorum court meetings is the county judge, who serves as the chief operating officer of the county. The county judge is elected at-large and does not vote in quorum court business, although capable of vetoing quorum court decisions. Though Yell County has two county seats, the constitutional officers are not duplicated, with duties split between the two courthouses.

Politics
Over the past few election cycles Yell county has trended heavily towards the GOP. The last Democratic presidential candidate (as of 2020) to carry this county was Bill Clinton in 1996.

Education

Public education
Early childhood, elementary and secondary education within Yell County is provided by four public school districts:
 Danville School District
 Dardanelle School District
 Two Rivers School District—formed in 2004 by the consolidation of the former Fourche Valley School District, Ola School District, Perry–Casa School District, and Plainview–Rover School District.
 Western Yell County School District—formed in 1985 by the consolidation of the former Belleville School District and Havana School District.

Dissolved school districts 
 Fourche Valley School District
 Ola School District
 Perry–Casa School District
 Plainview-Rover School District
 Havana School District
 Belleville School District
 Carden Bottoms School District

Public libraries
The Arkansas River Valley Regional Library System, is headquartered in Dardanelle and serves multiple counties and consists of one central library and six branch libraries, including the Yell County Library, a branch library in Danville.

Communities

Cities
 Belleville
 Danville (county seat)
 Dardanelle (county seat)
 Havana
 Ola
 Plainview

Towns
 Corinth

Census-designated places
 Centerville
 Rover

Unincorporated communities
 Alpha
 Aly
 Ard
 Bluffton
 Briggsville
 Chickalah
 Goodie Gorn Creek
 Gravelly
 Mount George
 New Neely
 Onyx
 Pleasant Hill
 Shark
 Sulphur Springs
 Wing

Townships

 Birta
 Bluffton
 Briggsville
 Centerville
 Chula
 Compton
 Crawford
 Danville (Corinth, Danville)
 Dardanelle (Dardanelle)
 Dutch Creek
 Ferguson (Belleville)
 Galla Rock
 Gilkey
 Gravelly Hill
 Herring
 Ions Creek
 Lamar (Plainview)
 Magazine
 Mason
 Mountain
 Prairie
 Richland
 Riley (Havana)
 Rover
 Sulphur Springs
 Ward (Ola)
 Waveland

Infrastructure

Major highways
  Highway 7
  Highway 10
  Highway 27
  Highway 28
  Highway 60
  Highway 80
  Highway 154

Notable people 
 Ray R. Allen (1920–2010), public official in Alexandria, Louisiana, was born in Yell County.
 John Daly, professional golfer
 Arthur Hunnicutt, Academy Award-nominated Western Actor
 Kelly Ring, WTVT news anchor
 Johnny Sain, Major League Baseball player
 William L. Spicer, Republican state chairman, 1962–1964, was born in Yell County, but owned a chain of drive-in theaters in Fort Smith.
 Cousins Jim Walkup (left-handed pitcher), and Jim Walkup (right-handed pitcher), MLB pitchers
 James Lee Witt, former FEMA Director
 Henry C. Bruton, Rear Admiral in the United States Navy, born in Belleville, Arkansas in 1905
 Jacob Lofland, American actor
 Timothy Balarabe, jazz musician.

Trivia
 In the novel (and two movies) True Grit, the heroine Mattie Ross is from near Dardanelle in Yell County.
 First Sergeant William Ellis of the 3rd Wisconsin Cavalry, was awarded the Medal of Honor for his valor and bravery above and beyond the call of duty at Dardanelle. At 10 a.m. on January 14, 1865, approximately 1,500 Confederates attacked the Union forces entrenched on the outskirts of the town and a fierce four-hour battle was waged. In the end Confederate Colonel William H. Brooks was unable to overcome the Union defenders of the town and was forced to retreat. It was during this battle that Ellis held his position even after receiving three wounds and would not withdraw for medical attention until he received a fourth wound and was ordered to retire by his commanding officer.

See also
 List of lakes in Yell County, Arkansas
 National Register of Historic Places listings in Yell County, Arkansas

References

External links
 Yell County official website 
 Yell County, Arkansas entry on the Encyclopedia of Arkansas History & Culture

 
1840 establishments in Arkansas
Populated places established in 1840
Russellville, Arkansas micropolitan area